Iruka may refer to:
 
Makasete Iruka!, an independent original video animation made by Akitaro Daichi
Lake Iruka, a reservoir located near the Meiji Mura
 the Japanese word for dolphin (イルカ)

People 
Soga no Iruka (died 645), statesman and son of Soga no Emishi
, singer

Fiction 
Iruka Umino, a Konohagakure ninja and instructor in the Naruto series